Hill Road is a road in Shek Tong Tsui, Hong Kong Island, Hong Kong.

Hill Road Flyover, an unusually tall elevated road opened on 18 August 1981, stretches above the large part of Hill Road.

See also

List of streets and roads in Hong Kong

References

Shek Tong Tsui
Roads on Hong Kong Island